Events from the year 1702 in Canada.

Incumbents
French Monarch: Louis XIV
English, Scottish and Irish Monarch: William III (until March 8), Anne (starting March 8)

Governors
Governor General of New France: Louis-Hector de Callière
Governor of Acadia: Claude-Sébastien de Villieu then Jacques-François de Monbeton de Brouillan
Colonial Governor of Louisiana: Sauvolle then Jean-Baptiste Le Moyne de Bienville
Governor of Plaisance: Joseph de Monic

Events
 Having begun in Europe in 1701, the War of the Spanish Succession spreads to North America (Queen Anne's War) in Acadia and New England.
 1702-13: The short-lived Peace of Ryswick collapses with the outbreak of the War of the Spanish Succession, which  erupts in the colonies as Queen Anne's War. It ends with France losing North American territory to Britain.
 1702-13: Queen Anne's War—Maine Abenakis and Iroquois from Quebec (Caughnawaga) attack the English colonists on behalf of the French, but lose. The European nations negotiate their settlement at the Treaty of Utrecht (1713); Louis XIV cedes Hudson Bay, Acadia (Nova Scotia) and Newfoundland (but not Cape Breton Island or St. John's Island) to Great Britain.

Deaths
 September 20 - Charles Aubert de La Chesnaye, businessman (born 1632)

Historical documents
In several weeks of talks, Indigenous leaders and New York governor discuss alliance, trade, peace, war and French influence

"All the glory of it" - Cadillac describes rich region and progress of his promising new settlement, Detroit (Note: racial stereotypes)

New York official suggests missionary society send ministers to Five Nations because Jesuits have drawn so many to Montreal area

As England, France, and Spain go to war, this medical guide to amputation is timely

This guide to letter-writing offers timely example of letter from wounded man to his love, and her reply

See also
List of years in Canada

References 

 
Canada
02